Gustav Schübler (15 August 1787 – 8 September 1834) was a German naturalist, and the founder of applied meteorology in Germany.

In 1817 Schübler became professor of botany, natural history and agricultural chemistry at the University of Tübingen, Germany. He worked in identifying and classifying new species, many with his colleague Georg Matthias von Martens (1788–1872).

Selected works 
 Grundsätze der Meteorologie in näherer Beziehung auf Deutschland's Klima, 1831 – Principles of meteorology as it applies to Germany's climate.
 Untersuchungen über die Vertheilung der Farben und Geruchsverhältnisse in der Familie der Rubiaceen, 1831 – Studies on the distribution of color and odor conditions in the family Rubiaceae.
 Untersuchungen über die Farbenveränderungen der Blüthen, 1833 – Studies on the changes of color in flowers.
 Flora von Württemberg, 1834 (with Georg Matthias von Martens) – Flora of Württemberg.

External links 
 Plants with abbreviation Schübl. at The International Plant Names Index.
 List of publications by Gustav Schübler on Google books.
 ADB:Schübler, Gustav @ Allgemeine Deutsche Biographie

Notes 

1787 births
1834 deaths
19th-century German botanists
German naturalists
German meteorologists
People from Heilbronn
Academic staff of the University of Tübingen